In mathematics, the layer cake representation of a non-negative, real-valued measurable function f defined on a measure space  is the formula

for all , where  denotes the indicator function of a subset  and  denotes the super-level set

The layer cake representation follows easily from observing that

and then using the formula

The layer cake representation takes its name from the representation of the value  as the sum of contributions from the "layers" : "layers"/values t below  contribute to the integral, while values t above  do not.
It is a generalization of Cavalieri's principle and is also known under this name.

An important consequence of the layer cake representation is the identity

which follows from it by applying the Fubini-Tonelli theorem.

An important application is that  for  can be written as follows

See also 
Symmetric decreasing rearrangement

References

 
 

Real analysis